Zhang Xiaowen ( born 15 July 1964) is a Chinese former international football defender who played for Guangdong throughout his career as well as representing China in the 1988 Olympics and 1988 Asian Cup.

Playing career
Zhang started his career playing for the Guangdong youth football team before being promoted to the team's senior squad in the 1983 league season. After establishing himself as a regular within the team, he was called up to the Chinese national team and played within the 1988 Olympics. While China had a disappointing tournament after being knocked out in the group stages, Zhang was still called up to represent China as he played within the 1988 Asian Cup, where they finished fourth.

International goals

Career statistics

International statistics

References

External links
 zhangxiaowen Team China Stats
 

1964 births
Living people
Chinese footballers
Footballers from Meizhou
People from Xingning
Hakka sportspeople
China international footballers
1988 AFC Asian Cup players
Olympic footballers of China
Footballers at the 1988 Summer Olympics
Association football defenders